Medicosma mulgraveana is a species of small tree in the family Rutaceae and is endemic to a restricted area of far north Queensland. It has mostly trifoliate leaves with elliptical to egg-shaped leaflets and white flowers borne in small groups in leaf axils.

Description

Taxonomy
Medicosma mulgraveana was first formally described in 1985 by Thomas Gordon Hartley in the Australian Journal of Botany from specimens collected near the East Mulgrave River in 1975.

Distribution and habitat

Conservation status
This species is classified as of "least concern" under the Queensland Government Nature Conservation Act 1992.

References

mulgraveana
Sapindales of Australia
Flora of Queensland
Plants described in 1985
Taxa named by Thomas Gordon Hartley